

References

External links
 New College of Florida
 New College of Florida Alumnae/i Association

New College of Florida